Česko Slovenská SuperStar (English: Czech&Slovak SuperStar) is the joint Czech-Slovak version of Idol series' Pop Idol merged from Česko hledá SuperStar and Slovensko hľadá SuperStar which previous to that had three individual seasons each.
The fourth season premiered in autumn 2015 with castings held in Prague, Brno, Ostrava, Žilina, Bratislava and Košice. It is broadcast on two channels: «TV Nova» (Czech Republic) and «Markíza» (Slovakia) which have also been the broadcast stations for the individual seasons. Also both hosts have been their hosts countries before as have been three out of the four judges.

Regional auditions
Auditions were held in Bratislava, Košice, Prague, Ostrava, Žilina and Brno in the summer of 2015.

Veľký výber
In Veľký výber where 100 contestants. The contestants first emerged on stage in groups of 9 or 10 but performed solo unaccompanied, and those who did not impress the judges were cut after the group finished their individual performances. 40 made it to the next round held in beach. Contestants will sing in duet. Next round is Dlouhá cesta. 20 contestants made it to the Semi-final.

Semi-final
20 semifinalists will revealed in October when the show premiered on screen. Ten boys and ten girls competed for a spot in the top 8. From each semi final 4 contestant will made it to the final. Public will choose one contestant and other three will be chosen by jury.

Top 10 - Boys

Top 10 - Girls

Finalist

Finals
Eight contestants made it to the finals. TOP 8 consists of 1 Slovak boy, 3 Czech boys, 3 Slovak girls and 1 Czech girl. The first single recorded by TOP 8 is cover version of  Česko Slovenská SuperStar 2009 theme song "Príbeh nekončí" (The Story Doesn't End). Every final night has its theme. Audience can vote for contestants from the very beginning of the show, voting ends during result show on the same day.

Top 8 – No. 1 Hits

Top 7 – Movies Night

 Group performance: 
TOP 7 - Girls: "A Little Party Never Killed Nobody" (Fergie)
TOP 7 - Boys: "Oh, Pretty Woman" (Roy Orbison)

Top 6 – Czech and Slovak Hits

Top 6 – Songs of Legends

Top 4 – Hits of Decades

Top 3 – Grand Final

Elimination chart

Contestants who appeared on other seasons/shows
 Veronika Vrublová was an artist on the first season of The Voice, joined Team Josef Vojtek and eliminated during first Live show.

External links 
Official Czech homepage hosted by Nova
Official Slovak homepage hosted by Markíza

Season 03
2010s Czech television series
2010s Slovak television series
2015 Czech television seasons
2015 Slovak television seasons